Pseudoxenodon baramensis, commonly known as the Baramen bamboo snake, is a species of snake in the family Colubridae. The species is endemic to Malaysia.

References

Pseudoxenodon
Reptiles described in 1921
Reptiles of Malaysia
Endemic fauna of Malaysia
Taxa named by Malcolm Arthur Smith
Reptiles of Borneo